The Clapper is a 2017 American comedy film written and directed by Dito Montiel, based on his novel Eddie Krumble Is the Clapper. It stars Ed Helms, Amanda Seyfried, Tracy Morgan, Adam Levine, Mickey Gooch Jr. and Russell Peters. It was the final film role of Alan Thicke, who died on December 13, 2016.

The film premiered at the Tribeca Film Festival on April 23, 2017, and was released on January 26, 2018 by Momentum Pictures.

Plot
Eddie Krumble (Ed Helms) is a widowed contract actor who works as an audience member for infomercials, with his best friend Chris (Tracy Morgan). He also has a budding romance with Judy (Amanda Seyfried), a shy gas station attendant.

One day he gets noticed by Stillerman (Russell Peters), a late night talk show host because of his frequent appearances as a recurring audience member. He loses his job due to Stillerman's segments searching for "the Clapper". The Stillerman Show's hunt for Eddie also gets Judy fired and she appears to go missing.

Initially declining offers to appear on Stillerman's show without payment (there is a rule against paying guests), Eddie caves in, appearing on the show to find Judy. After, Eddie and Chris do several "Searching for Judy" segments on the show, which they are paid for. After a few such segments, Judy phones the network and tells Eddie on-air to stop "stalking" her. Fearing a lawsuit, the show ends these segments and cut ties with Eddie and Chris.

Six months later, Eddie and Chris reappear on the show, as does Eddie's mother Ida (Brenda Vaccaro) berating Stillerman's treatment of her son. On air, Eddie admits that he misses his late wife and that he loves Judy, who sees the segment while she is pumping gas that night. As Eddie mentions on television where he'll be the next day, she finds him and tells him she loves him back. They subsequently marry in the closing credits.

Cast
 Ed Helms as Eddie Krumble
 Amanda Seyfried as Judy
 Tracy Morgan as Chris
 Brenda Vaccaro as Ida Krumble
 Leah Remini as Producer Louise
 Adam Levine as Raef Ranter
 Russell Peters as Stillerman
 James Ransone as Darth Guy
 Alan Thicke as himself
 Roger Guenveur Smith as Dr. Rogers B. Hay
 Mark Cuban as himself
 Todd Giebenhain as Tambakis
 Nico Santos as Buffet Person
 P. J. Byrne as Mr. Caldwell
 Billy Blanks as Billy Blanks
 Robert Axelrod as Spider Parson (voice)
 Wendy Braun as Wendy
 Rob Gronkowski as himself
 Sara Sampaio as herself
 Mickey Gooch Jr. as Yugoslavia

Production
In February 2016, it was announced Ed Helms and Amanda Seyfried would star in the film, with Dito Montiel directing the film from a screenplay he wrote, based on his novel of the same name. Helms and Mike Falbo would be producers under their Pacific Electric banner, with Robin Schoor. In April 2016, Tracy Morgan joined the cast, with Alex Lebovici and Michael Bien joining as an executive producer, and Steve Ponce as a producer under his Oriah Entertainment banner. In May 2016, Russell Peters joined the cast. In June 2016, Adam Levine, Leah Remini, P.J. Byrne, Mickey Gooch Jr. and Brenda Vaccaro joined the cast. Later that month, Mark Cuban, Rob Gronkowski and Sara Sampaio joined the cast. In July 2016, Wendy Braun joined the cast.

Filming began in June 2016.

Release
The film premiered at the Tribeca Film Festival on April 23, 2017. Shortly after, Momentum Pictures and Netflix acquired distribution rights.  It was released in a limited release and through video on demand on January 26, 2018 and on Netflix on May 1, 2018.

Critical response
On review aggregator website Rotten Tomatoes, the film holds an approval rating of 23% based on 26 reviews, with a weighted average of 4.3/10. The site's consensus reads: "The Clapper is tugged along by the valiant efforts of a talented cast, but it's ultimately not enough to make this wan romantic comedy worth a watch." On Metacritic, the film holds a weighted average score of 21 out of 100, based on 11 critics, indicating "generally unfavorable reviews".

Accolades

References

External links 
 
 
 

2017 films
Films based on American novels
Films directed by Dito Montiel
American comedy films
2017 comedy films
2010s English-language films
2010s American films